Bal Bharati Higher Secondary School Bewar Mainpuri (or Bal Bharati HSS) is a school in Bewar, Uttar Pradesh, India. It was established in 1983. The school is affiliated with the Board of High School and Intermediate Education Uttar Pradesh.

Cultural Events

The school hosted "Bewar" in October 2011.

References 

Primary schools in Uttar Pradesh
High schools and secondary schools in Uttar Pradesh
Mainpuri district
Educational institutions established in 1983
1983 establishments in Uttar Pradesh